O.P. Anderson Aquavit is a Swedish spirit of the akvavit type, presented in 1891 for the  Gothenburg Exhibition Fair under the name "Gammal Fin 1ma Aquavit". The firm producing it was called O.P. Anderson & Son i Göteborg, which has later given name to this brand of akvavit. Göteborg is the Swedish name for Gothenburg.

O.P. Anderson Aquavit is the oldest and most sold akvavit of Sweden, spiced with caraway, anise and fennel and stored on oak barrels for eight months. The spices are the same in the akvavits Gammaldags Norrlands Akvavit from 1929 and Skåne Akvavit from 1931, but Norrlands has sherry added to it and Skåne is blander.

As of 2021, it is produced by Anora Group.

References 

Swedish brands
Swedish vodkas